These are the results (medal winners) of the swimming competition at the 1973 World Aquatics Championships.

Medal table

Medal summary

Men

Legend: <small>WR – World record; CR – Championship record

Women

Legend: WR – World record; CR – Championship record

References
HistoFINA Men 
HistoFINA Women 

 
World Championships
1973 World Aquatics Championships
Swimming at the World Aquatics Championships